Grigori Rasputin (1869–1916) was a Siberian peasant and mystic, who became a healer and adviser for the Romanovs at the end of the Russian Empire. 

Rasputin may also refer to:

People
Maria Rasputin (1898–1977), Grigori Rasputin's daughter
Valentin Rasputin (1937–2015), Russian writer

Films
Rasputin, the Black Monk, a 1917 silent film
Rasputin (1928 film), aka Rasputin, the Prince of Sinners, a German-Soviet film directed by Nikolai Larin and Boris Nevolin 
Rasputin, the Holy Sinner (1928), aka Rasputin, the Holy Devil, a German silent film directed by Martin Berger
Rasputin (1929), an obscure German film directed by Max Neufeld who also played Rasputin in the film
Rasputin and the Empress (1932 film), starring Lionel Barrymore (as Rasputin), Ethel Barrymore and John Barrymore
Rasputin (1938 film), a French film directed by Marcel L'Herbier 
Rasputin (1954 film), a French-Italian film directed by Georges Combret 
Rasputin the Mad Monk, a 1966 British film starring Christopher Lee
Agony (1981 film), a 1975 Soviet film by director Elem Klimov released in the U.S. as Rasputin
Rasputin: Dark Servant of Destiny, a 1996 HBO made-for-television film
Rasputin (2010 film), a film directed by Louis Nero
Rasputin (2015 film), a romantic comedy film

Novels
Rasputin, a 1923 Russian novel by Ivan Nazhivin 
Rasputin, a 1927 German novel by Klabund, on which the 1932 MGM film was based
Rasputin (Orson Scott Card novel), planned but unpublished novel

Characters
Rasputin, a character in the graphic novel series, Corto Maltese
Rasputin (World Heroes), character in World Heroes
Grigori Rasputin (Hellboy), character in Hellboy
Illyana Rasputin, aka Magik, a character in X-Men
Mikhail Rasputin, a character in X-Men
Piotr Rasputin, aka Colossus, a character in X-Men
Mister Rasputin, a Marvel Comics supervillain
Razputin "Raz" Aquato, protagonist of the video game Psychonauts
Rasputin, the Mad Frog; one of the Punk Frogs from the Teenage Mutant Ninja Turtles series
Rasputin, aka AI-COM/RSPN, or the Tyrant, a character from the videogame Destiny

Music
"Rasputin" (song), by Boney M., 1978
Rasputin (opera), a 2003 opera by Einojuhani Rautavaara
Rasputin Music, a music chain in the San Francisco Bay Area of California
"Rasputin", a song by Cavalera Conspiracy from Blunt Force Trauma, 2011
"Rasputin", a song by Hard Rock Sofa, 2013
"Rasputin", a song by Jack Lucien from New 80s Musik, 2008
Rasputin – Miracles Lie in the Eye of the Beholder, a 2000 rock opera about Grigori Rasputin

See also
Rasputina (disambiguation)
 Rasputin Eddie Goldenberg
 Rasputin scandal
 Rasputin vs. Stalin

Russian-language surnames